The Mingus Big Band is a 14-piece ensemble, based in New York City, that specializes in the compositions of Charles Mingus. It was managed by his widow, Sue Mingus, along with the Mingus Orchestra and Mingus Dynasty. In addition to its weekly Monday night appearance at Jazz Standard in New York City, the Mingus Big Band tours frequently, giving performances and clinics in America, Europe, and other parts of the world. 

The band has received six Grammy Award nominations and won a Grammy in 2011 for  Best Large Jazz Ensemble Album for Mingus Big Band Live at Jazz Standard.

Discography 
 Nostalgia in Times Square (Dreyfus, 1993)
  (Dreyfus, 1995)
 Live in Time (Dreyfus, 1996)
 Que Viva Mingus! (Dreyfus, 1997)
 Blues & Politics (Dreyfus, 1999)
 Tonight at Noon: Three of Four Shades of Love (Dreyfus, 2002)
 I Am Three (Sunnyside, 2005)
 Live in Tokyo at the Blue Note (Sunnyside, 2006)
 Mingus Big Band Live at Jazz Standard (Jazz Workshop / Sue Mingus Music, 2010)
 Mingus Sings (Sunnyside, 2015)
 The Charles Mingus Centennial Sessions (Jazz Workshop, 2022)

Band roster

 Abraham Burton
 Adam Cruz
 Alex Foster
 Dr. Alexander Pope Norris
 Alex Sipiagin
 Andy McKee
 Anthony Fazio
 Brandon Wright
 Boris Kozlov
 Conrad Herwig
 Chris Potter
 Craig Handy
 David Lee Jones
 David Taylor
 David Kikoski
 Donald Edwards
 Earl Gardner
 Earl McIntyre
 Frank Lacy
 Jason Marshall
 Greg Gisbert
 Helen Sung
 Howard Johnson
 Jack Walrath
 Jimmy Knepper
 John Hicks
 John Stubblefield
 Kenny Drew, Jr.
 Kenny Rampton
 Lauren Sevian
 Michael Wang
 Mike Richmond
 Orrin Evans
 Philip Harper
 Randy Brecker
 Ronnie Cuber
 Ron Wilkins
 Ryan Kisor
 Sam Dillon
 Scott Robinson
 Seamus Blake
 Steve Slagle
 Tatum Greenblatt
 Coleman Hughes
 Theo Hill
 Tommy Campbell
 Vincent Herring
 Wayne Escoffery
 Walter White
 Johnathan Blake

References

External links
 Official Site

Experimental big bands
Post-bop ensembles
Avant-garde jazz ensembles
Big bands
Charles Mingus